José Miguel Ángel Mayans (born 19 March 1957) is an Argentine Justicialist Party politician. He sits in the Argentine Senate representing Formosa Province in the parliamentary bloc of the Frente de Todos.

Mayans has been described as a "fanatic anti-abortion lobbyist" despite being part of the progressive-leaning Frente de Todos. His conservative views have, at times, put him at odds with Peronist presidents Cristina Fernández de Kirchner and Alberto Fernández.

Mayans was elected to the Argentine Senate in 2001, and has been re-elected three times: in 2005, 2011, and 2017. After having served as vice-president of the Front for Victory bloc for 17 years, he was elected as president of the Frente de Todos bloc upon the coalition's establishment in 2019. Prior to being elected to the Senate, he was a member of the Chamber of Deputies of Formosa from 1987 to 2001.

Electoral history

References

External links
Official profile on the Senate website

1957 births
Living people
People from Clorinda, Formosa
Members of the Argentine Senate for Formosa
Justicialist Party politicians